Tang Yuanting (born 2 August 1994) is a Chinese badminton player specializing in doubles. She is a women's doubles Asian Champion and East Asian Games gold medalist. Tang was part of the China winning team in a Sudirman Cup, Uber Cup, Asia Team Championships, and an  East Asian Games. She competed at the 2016 Rio Olympics in the women's doubles event partnered with Yu Yang, but lost to the Korean pair in the bronze medal match. She retired from the international competition at the age of 22 in September 2016.

Tang Yuanting later moved to Australia to pursue her master of education degree at the University of Sydney, and then participated in the national badminton events.

Achievements

Asian Championships 
Women's doubles

East Asian Games 
Women's doubles

BWF Superseries 
The BWF Superseries, which was launched on 14 December 2006 and implemented in 2007, is a series of elite badminton tournaments, sanctioned by the Badminton World Federation (BWF). BWF Superseries levels are Superseries and Superseries Premier. A season of Superseries consists of twelve tournaments around the world that have been introduced since 2011. Successful players are invited to the Superseries Finals, which are held at the end of each year.

Women's doubles

  BWF Superseries Finals tournament
  BWF Superseries Premier tournament
  BWF Superseries tournament

BWF Grand Prix 
The BWF Grand Prix had two levels, the BWF Grand Prix and Grand Prix Gold. It was a series of badminton tournaments sanctioned by the Badminton World Federation (BWF) which was held from 2007 to 2017.

Women's doubles

  BWF Grand Prix Gold tournament
  BWF Grand Prix tournament

References

External links 
 
 

1994 births
Living people
People from Nanning
Badminton players from Guangxi
Chinese female badminton players
Badminton players at the 2016 Summer Olympics
Olympic badminton players of China
Chinese expatriate sportspeople in Australia
Australian female badminton players